Fedora 'Fedor' Ngondola Assombalanga (born 4 June 1969) is a Congolese former footballer who played as a striker for AS Dragons/Bilima. He was a lethal striker scoring nearly every match, and finished topscorer nearly every season in the Congolese National League. He scored over 30 goals each season.

Personal life
Assombalanga retired in 1992, and moved to live in London, England. His son, Britt Assombalonga, is also a professional footballer who plays for the DR Congo national team.

International career
Assombalonga played for Zaire in the 1992 African Nations Cup.

References

External links
 

Living people
1969 births
Association football forwards
Democratic Republic of the Congo footballers
AS Dragons players
Democratic Republic of the Congo emigrants to England
1992 African Cup of Nations players
Democratic Republic of the Congo international footballers